Achim Warmbold (born 17 July 1941) is a German former rally driver. He won the West German Rally Championship in 1971 and 1980, and scored two outright victories during the inaugural World Rally Championship season in 1973 at the Rally of Poland and Austrian Alpine Rally events.

Aside from his first WRC race, his co-driver throughout the 1973 and 1974 seasons was Jean Todt, who was to enjoy his greatest success as a World Championship-winning team manager in rallying, the 24 Hours of Le Mans and Formula One.

Achim Warmbold was also team manager of Mazda Rallye Team Europe during the Gr. B RX-7 programme. Warmbold also participated some rallies with that car.

External links
Profile of Achim Warmbold and list of results, World Rally Archive
Profile of Achim Warmbold and list of results, Rallybase.nl

1941 births
Living people
German rally drivers
World Rally Championship drivers
Sportspeople from Duisburg